Pasha Kola (also Romanized as Pāshā Kolā) is a village in Chelav Rural District, in the Central District of Amol County, Mazandaran Province, Iran. At the 2006 census, its population was 104, in 30 families.

References 

Populated places in Amol County